Gaudeamus is a song and dance festival attended by students from the Baltic states.

First festival took place in July 1956 in Tartu. In this festival, about 2500 students participated.

Festivals

1956 in Tartu
1958 in Riga
1967 in Tartu
1968 in Vilnius
1971 in Riga
1974 in Tartu
1984 in Tallin
2014 in Daugavpils
2018 in Tartu

See also
Baltic song festivals

References

External links

Festivals in Estonia
Festivals in Latvia
Arts festivals in Lithuania
Baltic states